Stanley Jackson (1914-1981) was a Canadian film director, producer, writer and narrator with the National Film Board of Canada (NFB).

Biography
Jackson began his career as a schoolteacher in Winnipeg, before taking a teaching position in Toronto. There, in 1942, he was hired by NFB producer Stuart Legg to conduct research for the new NFB series Canada Carries On. He wrote and directed the first film he worked on, Battle of the Harvests. At the time, Tom Daly was putting together the NFB’s now-famous Unit B; Jackson and Colin Low were its first two members. They were joined by Terence Macartney-Filgate, Robert Verrall, Norman McLaren, Roman Kroitor, Don Owen, Arthur Lipsett, Wolf Koenig and Hugh O'Connor.

Jackson soon distinguished himself as a writer, and as a narrator. He wrote most of his own scripts, and created a characteristic narration style for NFB, becoming known as ‘the voice of the NFB’. Of the 130 films he made, he was the narrator of 82, and Low would call him "irreplaceable" in the field of documentary film commentary.  Ironically, Jackson is also credited with helping to break the NFB narration style he helped to create, on Low and producer Tom Daly's 1954 film, Corral:

Jackson was known as a meticulous filmmaker and, along with Low, as the ‘conscience’ of Unit B; the two men worked together to make sure that no documentary descended  into voyeurism. Jackson was also the ‘peace-keeper’ of the unit, holding the team together as others found the personalities of Kroitor and Lipsett difficult to deal with. A bachelor with no relatives, Unit B was Jackson’s family—to the point where he paid the school tuition for Kroitor’s son for two years. He retired for health reasons in 1971 and died in Toronto in 1981, at age 67.

Filmography
All National Film Board of Canada

Canada Carries On: Battle of the Harvests - documentary short, 1942 - writer, director
Canada Carries On: Thought for Food - documentary short, 1943 - writer, director
Home to the Land - documentary short, 1944 - writer, director
Hands for the Harvest - documentary short, 1944 - writer, director
The Plots Thicken - animated short, 1944 - writer, director
This is Our Land - documentary short, 1945 - writer, producer, director
Canada Carries On: This is Our Canada - documentary short, 1945 - writer, producer, director
Condition Improved - documentary short, 1946 - writer, director
Ukrainian Festival - documentary short, 1947 - writer, co-producer, co-director with John H. Tyo
Who Will Teach Your Child? - documentary short, 1948 - writer, editor, director
Canada Carries On: Summer is for Kids - documentary short, 1949 - producer, director
Canada Carries On: Our Town is the World - short film, 1950 - director
Feelings of Depression - documentary short, 1950 - writer, director
Depressive States - documentary short, 1951 - writer, director
Schizophrenia: Catatonic Type - documentary short, 1951 - writer, director
Schizophrenia: Hebephrenic Type - documentary short, 1951 - writer, director
Schizophrenia: Simple Type: Deteriorated - documentary short, 1951 - writer, director
Paranoid Conditions - documentary short, 1951 - writer, director
Organic Reaction Type: Senile - documentary short, 1951 - writer, director
Manic State - documentary short, 1952 - writer, director
Paul Tomkowicz: Street-Railway Switchman - documentary short, Roman Kroitor 1953 - writer
Shyness - documentary short, 1953 - writer, director
The Ballot-o-Maniac - short film, 1953 - writer, director
One Little Indian - animated puppet film, 1954 - writer, director
To Serve the Mind - short film, 1955 - writer, director, co-narrator with Tom McBride
The Pony - short film, Lawrence Cherry 1955 - narrator
Introducing Canada - documentary short, Tom Daly 1956 - writer
Profile of a Problem Drinker - short film, 1957 - writer, director
Looking Beyond…Story of a Film Council - documentary short, 1957 - writer, director 
The Quest - short film, 1958 - director 
Stigma -short film, 1958 - writer, director 
Town Planning (The Master Plan) - documentary short, Louis Portugais 1958 - narrator
Trans Canada Summer - documentary, Ronald Dick 1958 - writer, narrator
Memory of Summer - documentary short, 1958 - writer, director 
A Foreign Language - documentary short, 1958 - writer, director 
The Days Before Christmas - documentary short, 1958 - co-writer and co-director with Terence Macartney-Filgate and Wolf Koenig
The Back-Breaking Leaf - documentary short, Terence Macartney-Filgate 1959 - writer, narrator
The Canadians - documentary short, Terence Macartney-Filgate 1959 - writer, narrator
Emergency Ward - documentary short, William Greaves 1959 - writer, narrator
Glenn Gould - On the Record - documentary short, Wolf Koenig & Roman Kroitor 1959 - co-writer, narrator
Glenn Gould - Off the Record - documentary short, Wolf Koenig & Roman Kroitor 1959 - co-writer, narrator
Tourist Go Home -short film, 1959 - co-writer and co-director with Ron Weyman
Roughnecks: The Story of Oil Drillers - documentary short, Guy L. Coté 1960 - narrator
The Cars in Your Life - documentary short, Terence Macartney-Filgate 1960 - writer, narrator
Circle of the Sun - documentary short, Colin Low 1960 - co-writer with Colin Low
Universe - documentary short, Colin Low & Roman Kroitor 1960 - commentary
The Discovery of Insulin - documentary short, 1961 - director
Wrestling - documentary short, Michel Brault, Claude Jutra, Marcel Carrière, Claude Fornier 1961 - narrator
Mathematics at Your Fingertips - documentary short, John Howe 1961 - writer, narrator
The Days of Whiskey Gap - documentary short, Colin Low 1961 - writer, narrator
University - documentary, 1961 - director
The Peep Show - cartoon, Kaj Pindal 1962 - narrator
My Financial Career - animated short, Gerald Potterton 1962 - writer, narrator
The Living Machine - documentary, Roman Kroitor 1962 - writer, narrator
The Origins of Weather - animated documentary short, Joe Koenig 1963 - narrator
Cornet at Night - short film, 1963 - writer, director
Children Learn from Filmstrips - documentary short, 1963 - director, narrator
Paul-Émile Borduas 1905-1960 - documentary short, Jacques Godbout 1963 - co-narrator with Percy Rodriguez
Trail Ride - documentary short, Ernest Reid 1964 - writer, narrator
The Transition - documentary short, Mort Ransen 1964 - narrator
The Hundredth Summer - documentary, Terence Macartney-Filgate 1964 - writer, narrator
The Moontrap - documentary, Michel Brault, Marcel Carrière and Pierre Perrault 1964 - writer, narrator
Among Fish - documentary short, 1964, co-director with Mort Ransen & Kenneth McCready
The Hutterites - documentary short, Colin Low 1964 - writer, narrator 
Above the Horizon - documentary short, Roman Kroitor and Hugh O'Connor 1964, writer, narrator
Antigonish - documentary short, 1964 - director
Legault's Place - documentary short, Suzanne Angel 1964 - writer, narrator 
Jet Pilot - documentary short, Joe Koenig 1964 - writer, narrator 
About Flowers - documentary short, René Jodoin 1964 - writer
A Tree is a Living Thing - documentary short, Vincent Vaitiekunas 1964 - writer, narrator 
Two Men of Montreal - documentary, Suzanne Angel, Donald Brittain & Don Owen 1965 - co-writer with Donald Brittain
Henry Larsen - documentary short, John Kemeny 1965 - writer, narrator
War II: Total War - documentary short, William Canning 1965 - writer, narrator
Instant French - short film, David Bearstow 1965 - writer
Stefansson: The Arctic Prophet - documentary short, John Kemeny 1965 - narrator 
The Forest - documentary short, John Spotton 1966 - writer
The Long Haul Men - documentary short, Michael Rubbo 1966 - writer, narrator 
The People at Dipper - documentary short, Richard Gilbert and Jack Ofield 1966 - writer, narrator 
Island Observed - documentary short, Hector Lemieux 1966 - writer
Paddle to the Sea - documentary short, Bill Mason 1966 - co-producer, writer, narrator
Helicopter Canada - documentary, Eugene Boyko 1966 - narrator
Steeltown - documentary, Walford Hewitson 1966 - writer
After Eve - documentary short, Michael J.F. Scott 1967 - writer, narrator
The Transportation of Ore Concentrate - documentary short, Eugene Boyko 1967 - writer, narrator
The Name of the Game is Volleyball - documentary short, Hector Lemieux 1967 - writer, narrator
Charlie’s Day - short film, Martin Defalco 1967 - narrator
The Indian Speaks - documentary, Marcel Carrière 1967 - writer, narrator
They’re Putting Us Off the Map - documentary short, Michael J.F. Scott 1968 - writer, narrator
Foresters - documentary short, Werner Aellen 1968 - narrator
Standing Buffalo - documentary short, Joan Henson 1968 - writer
The World of One in Five - documentary short, James Carney 1969 - writer, narrator
Pathways to the Sky - documentary short, Hector Lemieux 1969 - writer, narrator
If He Is Devoured, I Win - experimental film, Rick Raxlen 1969 - co-producer with Tom Daly
Aqua Rondo - documentary short, Jacques Bensimon 1969 - writer, narrator 
Of Many People - documentary short, 1970 - writer, director
Introduction to Labrador - documentary short, George C. Stoney and Harvey Best 1970 - writer, narrator
Tee-Won Short - documentary short (3 parts), Michael J. F. Scott 1970 - producer
Death of a Legend - documentary, Bill Mason 1970 - writer
The Conquered Dream - documentary, Michael McKennirey and Richard Robinson 1971 - writer, narrator
People of the Seal, Part 1: Eskimo Summer - documentary, Michael McKennirey and Richard Robinson 1971 - writer
People of the Seal, Part 1: Eskimo Winter - documentary, Michael McKennirey and Richard Robinson 1971 - writer
The Sea - documentary short, Bané Jovanovic 1971 - co-writer with Joseph B. MacInnis
Here is Canada - documentary short, Tony Ianzelo 1972 - writer, narrator
Kainai - documentary short, Raoul Fox 1973 - writer
Child, Part 1: Jamie, Ethan and Marlon: The First Two Months - documentary short, Robert Humble 1973 - writer, narrator
Child, Part 2: Jamie, Ethan and Keir: 2-14 Months - documentary short, Robert Humble 1973 - writer, narrator
Mr. Symbol Man - documentary, Bruce Moir & Bob Kingsbury 1974 - writer, narrator
The New Alchemists - documentary, Dorothy Todd Henaut 1974 - writer, narrator
Child, Part 3: Debbie and Robert: 12-24 Months - documentary short, Robert Humble 1974 - writer, narrator
The Boat That Ian Built - documentary short, Andy Thomson 1974 - co-producer with Colin Low
Freshwater World - documentary short, Giles Walker 1974 - narrator, co-writer 
The Light Fantastik - documentary short, Michel Patenaude and Rupert Glover 1974 - writer, narrator
Enemy Alien - documentary short, Jeanette Lerman 1975 - narrator, co-writer with Jeanette Lerman
Jack Rabbit - documentary short, Bill Brind 1975 - writer, narrator
The Outcome of Income - animated documentary short, Veronika Soul 1975 - writer, narrator
Have I Ever Lied to You Before? - documentary, John Spotton 1976 - writer, narrator
A Pinto for the Prince - documentary short 1976 - Colin Low and John Spotton, writer, narrator
The Great Clean-Up - documentary, James Carney 1976 - writer, narrator
First Steps - documentary short, Philip Bridgeman and Alec MacLeod 1976 - writer, producer, narrator
The Vacant Lot - documentary short, Judith Merritt 1977 - co-producer with Donald Brittain
The 1 CAG Story - documentary short, Douglas Cameron and Andy Thomson 1977 - writer
Child, Part 4: Kathy and Ian: Three-Year-Olds - documentary short, Robert Humble 1977 - writer, narrator
Child, Part 5: 4 Years - 6 Years - documentary short, Robert Humble 1978 - writer, narrator 
Flash William - documentary short, Tom Radford 1978 - co-writer, narrator 
The Forests and Vladimir Krajina - documentary short, John Laing and Thomas Burstyn 1978 - writer, narrator 
Canada Vignettes: Helen Law - documentary short, Jennifer Hodge de Silva 1979 - writer
China Mission: The Chester Ronning Story - documentary, Tom Radford 1979 - co-writer with Tom Radford
John Law and the Mississippi Bubble - animated short, Richard Condie 1979 - writer, narrator
Unemployment: Voices from the Line - documentary short, Pierre Lasry 1979 - narrator
Prairie Album - animated documentary short, Blake James 1979 - writer

Awards

Who Will Teach Your Child? (1948)
 1st Canadian Film Awards, Ottawa: Best Theatrical Short, 1950
 Scholastic Teacher Magazine Annual Film Awards: Top-Ten List: Best 16mm Information Films of 1949

Canada Carries On: Summer is for Kids (1949)
 2nd Canadian Film Awards, Ottawa: Honourable Mention, Theatrical Short, 1950
Feelings of Depression (1950)
 3rd Canadian Film Awards, Ottawa: Genie Award for Best Non-Theatrical Film, 1951
To Serve the Mind (1955)
 Golden Reel International Film Festival, Film Council of America, Chicago: Silver Reel, Health, 1956

The Quest (1958)
 11th Canadian Film Awards, Toronto: Award of Merit, Theatrical Short, 1959
 HYSPA Healthcare & Sports Exhibition, Bern: Diploma of Merit, 1961

Children Learn from Filmstrips (1963)
 Columbus International Film & Animation Festival, Columbus, Ohio: Chris Award, Adult Education/Teachers, 1963

Cornet at Night (1963)
 American Film and Video Festival, New York: Blue Ribbon, Stories for Children, 1965

References

External links

1914 births
1981 deaths
Canadian male screenwriters
National Film Board of Canada people
Canadian documentary film directors
Film directors from Winnipeg
Male actors from Winnipeg
Writers from Winnipeg
Canadian male voice actors
20th-century Canadian screenwriters